The following lists Everton's League performances, top goalscorers and average attendances from 1888, when the Football League was formed, to the end of the most recent completed season. For a more detailed history see History of Everton F.C.

The 98 full seasons in the 20th century were reduced to 87 deducting the war years. Everton competed in 83 top flight seasons in the 20th century, the highest of any club. Everton averaged a top flight position of 8.15.  Everton were founder members of the Football League in 1888 and were champions of it for the first time in 1891. By the time World War II broke out in 1939, they had been league champions five times and had fielded some of the biggest names in English football, including goalkeeper Ted Sagar and forwards Dixie Dean and Tommy Lawton. In Everton's title-winning season of 1927–28, Dean scored a record 60 league goals in a single season – which has not been matched in this country since.

Everton originally played at Anfield until a dispute with their landlord in 1892 saw the club exit the ground, which was re-occupied by the newly formed Liverpool, who gradually became Everton's fierce local rivals. Everton, meanwhile, settled into nearby Goodison Park, where they have played ever since, in spite of a series of plans since the late 1990s to relocate the club to a new stadium.

Everton hold the record of playing most seasons in the top flight of English football, only ever playing four seasons out since the creation of the Football League in 1888. The club have played at the top level continuously since 1954, with only Arsenal having a longer unbroken run at the highest level.

After World War II, Everton's first major success came in 1963, when the league title was won under the management of Harry Catterick, who added another league title to Everton's honours list in 1970 as well as the FA Cup in 1966.

Another golden era at Everton prevailed after the appointment of Howard Kendall as manager in 1981. Everton won the FA Cup in 1984 and were league champions in 1985, when they also won their first European trophy in the shape of the European Cup Winners' Cup. Another league title followed in 1987.

Everton's only major trophy since 1987 came in 1995 when they won the FA Cup under the management of Joe Royle, who like Kendall had been with the club during his playing career. Since the formation of the FA Premier League in 1992, their highest league finish was fourth place in 2005 and on one occasion (1998) they finished one place above the relegation zone, only avoiding relegation on goal difference.

The appointment of David Moyes as manager in 2002 brought something of a turning point in Everton's recent history, as the Scot re-established the club as a regular feature in the top few places of the English league, although he failed to add any silverware, the club being finalists in the 2009 FA Cup Final. Moyes departed in 2013 after 11 years as Everton manager to take charge of Manchester United, being succeeded by Roberto Martinez, who had a promising first season but was sacked after three seasons to be replaced by Ronald Koeman. Koeman was dismissed in October 2017, with the club lying in 18th position in the initial stage of the 2017–18 season. Koeman was replaced by Sam Allardyce with the team eventually finishing 8th in the Premier League. Allardyce had his 18-month contract terminated at the end of the season.

On 31 May 2018, Everton appointed Marco Silva, as their new manager. Silva had originally been approached to become the clubs' manager in October 2017, following the dismissal of Ronald Koeman. However, at that stage he was still manager of Watford and subsequently any proposed deal at that time fell through. Silva was replaced at Watford in January 2018, after a bad run of results in the Premier League. Evertons' pursuit of Silva resurfaced after the club parted company with Sam Allardyce.

On 6 December 2019, Silva was dismissed after a poor run of results left the club in the relegation zone. Silva's team had won 24 and lost 24 of their league games under his tenure. On 21 December 2019, Carlo Ancelotti was appointed the club's new manager on a four and a half year contract. However, he would depart the club on 1 June 2021, returning to coach Real Madrid. On 30 June 2021, Rafael Benítez was appointed, becoming only the second ever man to manage both Everton and Liverpool. His reign, however, would last for only six months, as he was sacked on 16 January 2022, making him the shortest-serving permanent manager in Everton's history. Frank Lampard replaced him at the end of the month, but he would be sacked as well, lasting barely a year. A week after Lampard's sacking, Sean Dyche was appointed as the new manager.

Seasons

1887–1955

1955–present 
The first UEFA club competition, the European Cup, currently known as the UEFA Champions League, was created for the 1955–56 season.

Key 

 European competitions:
 EC/CL – European Cup/Champions League
 CWC – Cup Winners' Cup
 ICFC – Inter-City Fairs Cup
 UEFA/EL – UEFA Cup/Europa League

 Other:
 N/A – Not applicable; competition yet to be founded or not held
 DNE – Did not enter
 DNQ – Did not qualify
 Pre, R1, R2, R3, R4, R5, R of 32, R of 16, QF, SF, RU, W – Tournament placing
 Bolded goalscorers were top overall goalscorer in respective division/league.
 Background colours:
 Gold – Winners
 Silver – Runners-up
 Red – Relegated
 Green – Promoted

Notes:
 From 1888–89 to 1980–81, 2 points were awarded for a win. From 1981–82 to the present day, 3 points are awarded for a win.
 League Cup did not start until 1960–61 season.
 Some attendances figures are estimates.

Notes

References 
 
Every Everton League and cup result by season from 1888/89 at footballsite

 

Seasons
 
English football club seasons
Seasons